New Routes is the 25th studio album by American country band Asleep at the Wheel. Recorded at Bismeaux Studios and Arlyn Studios in Austin, Texas, it was produced by the band's frontman Ray Benson with manager and engineer Sam Seifert (plus Seth and Scott Avett on one track), and released on September 14, 2018 by Benson's own Bismeaux Productions with Thirty Tigers. It is the group's first album to feature original material since 2007's Reinventing the Wheel.

Between 2007 and 2016, Asleep at the Wheel issued two Christmas albums (Santa Loves to Boogie and Lone Star Christmas Night), two collaborations (Willie and the Wheel and It's a Good Day) and their third Bob Wills tribute, Still the King. For their first album of original material in over ten years, the group recorded songs written by both lead vocalists, Ray Benson and Katie Shore, alongside cover versions of tracks by Johnny Cash, Guy Clark, Paolo Nutini and others.

New Routes was supported by the release of "Jack I'm Mellow", "Seven Nights to Rock" and "Willie Got There First" (featuring Seth and Scott Avett) as singles in 2018. The album was the band's first release to feature bassist Josh Hoag and their last to include steel guitarist Eddie Rivers and saxophonist Jay Reynolds, both of whom left the year after its release. It did not chart, but received positive reviews from several critics who praised Shore's contribution to the material.

Background
After the release of the band's last album, 2016's Lone Star Christmas Night, Asleep at the Wheel brought in new bassist Josh Hoag to replace David Earl Miller after 25 years. New Routes marks the band's first album of largely original material since 2007's Reinventing the Wheel. According to the group's co-lead vocalist and fiddler Katie Shore, the band recorded "close to 30 songs" during sessions for New Routes, which they then had to "whittle down" for the final track listing. Frontman Ray Benson added that the band would likely use some of the tracks for a future release, claiming it was "hard to whittle it down to the 10 or so" that were ultimately released. Closing track "Willie Got There First" was introduced later in the production process by writer Seth Avett and features Scott Avett, Bobbie Nelson and Mickey Raphael.

Several commentators noted the wide variety of styles present on New Routes. Writing for Rolling Stone magazine, Jeff Gage claimed that "On New Routes, the latest iteration of the band shows just how adaptive it can be", while AllMusic's Stephen Thomas Erlewine described the album as "something a rebirth for the veteran Western swing outfit". Jeff Tamarkin of Relix, however, claimed that the album was less of a "reinvention" and more a "fine-tuning". Interviewing Benson and Shore for the website the Bluegrass Situation, Amanda Wicks suggested that New Routes contains elements of "Cajun swamp, Irish traditional music, gypsy folk, and more".

The closing track on the album, "Willie Got There First", pays tribute to Willie Nelson. According to Wicks, it "claims that Nelson has already written and sung practically every feeling that needs to be written and sung". Benson recalls his response to the song, claiming that "A song like that, usually I go, 'Nah, nah, that's a gimmick song and song title.' But this was poetry. The Avetts have an incredible songwriting sense." For the track's recording, the group worked with Seth and Scott Avett, as well as Nelson's sister Bobbie on piano and his bandmate Mickey Raphael on harmonica.

Reception

Media response to New Routes was largely positive. Writing for the website AllMusic, Stephen Thomas Erlewine claimed that the band had "revitalized themselves and delivered a record that's a rip-roaring good time" on the album, praising vocalist and fiddler Katie Shore's contributions to the recordings which he described as "a sweet contrast to Benson's baritone". Music Connection's Andy Kaufmann was similarly positive, awarding it a rating of 8 out of 10 and calling it "a return that is deserving of the attention of fans young and old". The Austin Chronicle columnist Tim Stegall also hailed Shore as a strong element of the album, dubbing her performances on "Jack I'm Mellow" and "Call It a Day Tonight" as among the record's "stronger thrills", alongside Benson's performance on "Dublin Blues".

Track listing

Personnel

Asleep at the Wheel
Ray Benson – guitar, vocals , arrangements , production
Katie Shore – fiddle , vocals 
Eddie Rivers – steel guitar , saxophone 
Josh Hoag – bass
Connor Forsyth – piano, accordion , organ 
David Sanger – drums
Dennis Ludiker – fiddle , mandolin , backing vocals , handclaps 
Jay Reynolds – saxophone , clarinet 

Additional personnel
Sam Seifert – production, engineering, mixing, guitar , backing vocals , handclaps , dobro 
Steve Mazur – engineering, mixing
Tyler Merriman – engineering, backing vocals , handclaps 
Blake Lauritzen – handclaps 
Eleanor Newman – handclaps 
Mindy Espy-Reyes – handclaps 
Seth Avett – acoustic guitar, vocals and production 
Scott Avett – banjo, vocals and production 
Bobbie Nelson – piano 
Mickey Raphael – harmonica

References

External links

Asleep at the Wheel albums
2018 albums